The War of Independence is a Pulitzer Prize-winning book by American historian Claude H. Van Tyne, published in 1929. It explains the history and causes of the American Revolutionary War. Van Tyne won the Pulitzer Prize for History for this book in 1930.

References

Recruitment to the IDF – the War of Independence,Exhibition in the IDF&Defense establishment archives

1929 non-fiction books
Pulitzer Prize for History-winning works
Houghton Mifflin books
History books about the American Revolution
American history books